Karin Kienhuis (born 24 February 1971) is a Dutch judoka. She competed at the 1996 Summer Olympics and the 2000 Summer Olympics.

References

1971 births
Living people
Dutch female judoka
Olympic judoka of the Netherlands
Judoka at the 1996 Summer Olympics
Judoka at the 2000 Summer Olympics
Sportspeople from Almelo